Kiyo Takeda (21 September 1896 – 14 March 1954) was a Japanese educator and politician. She was one of the first group of women elected to the House of Representatives in 1946.

Biography
The family later moved to Yamaguchi Prefecture when her father was transferred there for work.

After World War II, Takeda joined the Liberal Party. She was a candidate for the party in Hiroshima in the 1946 general elections (the first in which women could vote), and was elected to the House of Representatives. She was re-elected in the 1947 elections, shortly after which she joined the Democratic Party. She lost her seat in the 1949 elections and died of a cerebral haemorrhage in 1954.

References

1896 births
Ochanomizu University alumni
Japanese schoolteachers
20th-century Japanese women politicians
20th-century Japanese politicians
Members of the House of Representatives (Japan)
Liberal Party (Japan, 1945) politicians
Democratic Party (Japan, 1947) politicians
1954 deaths